The 2016–17 BCHL season was the 55th season of the British Columbia Hockey League (BCHL). The seventeen teams from the Interior, Island and Mainland divisions played 58-game schedules. The 2016 BCHL Showcase, hosted in Chilliwack, was held shortly after the start of the season from September 21 to 25, 2016.

In March, the top teams from each division plays for the Fred Page Cup, the BCHL Championship. The league champion then moved on to compete in the Western Canadian Junior A championship, the Western Canada Cup, in Penticton, British Columbia. If successful against the winners of the Alberta Junior Hockey League, Saskatchewan Junior Hockey League, Manitoba Junior Hockey League and the 2017 Western Canada Cup hosts, the Penticton Vees, the champion and runner-up would then move on to play for the Canadian Junior Hockey League championship, the Royal Bank Cup, in Coburg, Ontario. Since the Vees won the Fred Page Cup, their opponents in the finals, the Chilliwack Chiefs, represented the BCHL in the Western Canada Cup.

League changes
The Fred Page Cup playoff format changed to:
The top four teams in the mainland and island division, and top five teams in the interior division, qualify for the playoffs
The final sixth spot in the interior division can be claimed by whoever finishes higher in the standings between the sixth place interior team and the fifth place mainland team.
The top two teams in the interior division receive a first round bye.
Each series is a best-of-seven
The three team round robin semifinal has been eliminated.

Standings
Note:  GP = Games Played, W = Wins, L = Losses, T = Ties, OTL = Overtime Losses, Pts = Points

Standings listed on the official league website.

2016–17 BCHL Fred Page Cup Playoffs

Division playoffs

Note: If the Mainland #5 seed finishes higher in the regular season standings than the Interior #6 seed, they will face the Interior #3 seed in the first round. Interior teams are re-seeded at the start of the second round.

2017 Western Canada Cup
The Chilliwack Chiefs, who lost to Western Canada Cup hosts Penticton in the final, will advance to the 2017 Western Canada Cup in Penticton, British Columbia where they will play for one of two spots in the 2017 Royal Bank Cup.

Scoring Leaders
GP = Games Played, G = Goals, A = Assists, P = Points, PIM = Penalties In Minutes

Leading Goaltenders
Note: GP = Games Played, Mins = Minutes Played, W = Wins, L = Losses, T = Ties, OTL = Overtime Losses, GA = Goals Against, SO = Shutouts, Sv% = Save Percentage, GAA = Goals Against Average.

Award Winners
Brett Hull Trophy (Top Scorer): Brendan Harris, Wenatchee Wild (23 goals, 75 assists, 98 points)
Best Defenceman: Jake Stevens, Victoria Grizzlies
Bruce Allison Memorial Trophy (Rookie of the Year): Cam Donaldson, Powell River Kings
Bob Fenton Trophy (Most Sportsmanlike): Brendan Harris, Wenatchee Wild
Top Goaltender: Darion Hanson, Vernon Vipers (1.84)
Wally Forslund Memorial Trophy (Best Goaltending Duo):  Mat Robson and Nolan Hildebrand, Penticton Vees (2.14)
Vern Dye Memorial Trophy (regular-season MVP): Brendan Harris, Wenatchee Wild
Joe Tennant Memorial Trophy (Coach of the Year): Bliss Littler, Wenatchee Wild
Ron Boileau Memorial Trophy (Best Regular Season Record): Wenatchee Wild, 94 pts
Fred Page Cup (League Champions): Penticton Vees

Players Selected in 2017 NHL Entry Draft
Rd5: 148 Kale Howarth - Columbus Blue Jackets (Trail Smoke Eaters)

See also
2016 in ice hockey
2017 in ice hockey

References

External links
Official Website of the British Columbia Hockey League
Official Website of the Canadian Junior Hockey League

BCHL
British Columbia Hockey League seasons